Olly, Syd and Millie were the official mascots of the 2000 Summer Olympics, and Lizzie was the official mascot of the 2000 Summer Paralympics, both held in Sydney, Australia.

Olly, Syd and Millie were named by Philip Sheldon from advertising agency DMBB and represented air, soil and water. Olly (from Olympics) the kookaburra represents the Olympic spirit of generosity. Syd (from Sydney) the platypus represents the environment as well as the activity and energy of Australia and their population. Millie (from Millennium) the echidna knows everything about technology and numerical data. The mascots were designed by Matthew Hattan and Jozef Szekeres.

The mascot for the 2000 Paralympics was Lizzie the frill-necked lizard, a native Australian animal which inhabits northern parts of the country. The shape of the character's frill represented the geographical shape of the country, and the ochre colour of Lizzie's body aimed to mirror the colour of the land. The lizard was chosen because of the animal's survival instincts and tenacity, and was intended to represent the character traits of Paralympic athletes.

Lizzie's voice was provided by Olivia Newton-John, who made appearances alongside Lizzie leading up and during the Games.

The visibility of and community engagement with Lizzie outpaced that of the other three Olympic mascots. The Australian Paralympic Committees noted the significant branding capital and realised that this could be leveraged in the future.

In 2021, Lizzie made a return as a part of the Royal Australian Mint's "Aussie Heroes" $2 coin collection and, later, a sticker pack promoted in Woolworths made for the 2020 Summer Olympics.

See also

Fatso the Fat-Arsed Wombat, an unofficial mascot of the 2000 Games.
List of Australian sporting mascots
List of Olympic mascots
List of Paralympic mascots

References

External links

2000 Summer Olympics
2000 Summer Paralympics
Mascots introduced in 2000
Paralympic mascots
Australian mascots
Fictional monotremes
Fictional birds
Fictional lizards
Lizard mascots
Australian culture
Animal mascots
Fictional people from New South Wales